The SRL Southwest Tour Series is a late model stock car racing league operating since 2001. The series is a continuation of the Tri-Track Challenge run in California between 1997 and 2000. The series is also connected to the former Supermodified Racing League, previously headed by Davey Hamilton. Through the years the series expanded its racing calendar as well as racing series adding spec late model series and Legends car racing.

History

Tri-Track Challenge
Starting in 1997 Madera Speedway, Stockton 99 Speedway and Altamont Motorsports Park started cooperating to form the Tri-Track Challenge for their late model racing classes. Eric Holmes raced in the series in 1998. The 1999 season was won by Burney Lamar, despite only winning a single race at Stockton. Terpstra, Fensler, Holmes and Tucker completed the top five. After the 2000 season, won by Jim Pettit, II, the series was disbanded. The main reason being Stockton 99 Speedway not wanting to continue to support the series.

Supermodified Racing League
In January 2001 the promoters of Altamont and Madera tried to found a series the same rules as the existing NASCAR Elite Division. Davey Hamilton and Rick Gerhardt, promoting a California-based supermodified racing division under the Supermodified Racing League sanctioning body offered to sanction the new late model series under their umbrella. The SRL Wild West Shootout Late Model Series was founded for the 2001 season with Altamont and Madera running six races each. Stockton returned on the calendar for the 2002 season. Gerhardt sold his interest in the series at the beginning of 2004 to Steve Fensler. For 2005 the supermodified division was sold to form the Western States Supermodified Racing League. The late model series continued under the management of Fensler.

SRL Southwest Tour
For 2006 the SRL Southwest Tour was formed in affiliation with the ASA. After the announcement that the NASCAR Elite Division would be disbanded after the 2006 season the NASCAR organisation encouraged the Elite Division teams to join the SRL series.

Legends car racing was introduced in the SRL series in 2010. With spec legends cars built by US Legend Cars the series was run following the INEX regulations. Cale Kanke won the first two seasons before graduating into the Southwest Tour in 2015. In 2011 Sean Rayhall and Ben Rhodes were some of the guest starters in the series. Despite attracting large grids, the series was discontinued after the 2015 season.

For 2013 the S2 class was introduced, later renamed as the spec late model class. The series focused on young drivers coming from go-karts or legends racing. The first season was won by Ryan Cansdale who later graduated into the main Southwest Tour. The 2014 season was won by Brandon Weaver.

A pre-season non-championship race, the SRL Winter Showdown, was introduced in 2015. The race at Kern County Raceway Park invited many non-SRL racers to compete for the crown. New to the SRL series were Dustin Ash, Preston Peltier, Dalton Sargeant among others. South-eastern based short track specialist Bubba Pollard won the first two editions of the race.

Classes

SRL Southwest Tour
The main series is a super late model stock car based class, with cars similar to those used at major Super Late Model races such as the Snowball Derby, All American 400, Anderson 400, and other such major events on the short track racing scene.  The series is open to any chassis fabricator such as Lefthander, LFR or Howe. The bodies, based on late model cars by Chevrolet, Ford, Dodge or Toyota.

Racecar Factory Spec Late Model Touring Series
The spec late model class (also known as the S2 class) is a class for spec racing late model stock cars. The cars ar built by the Racecar Factory based in Irwindale, California. The tube chassis is slightly smaller than a regular (super) late model car. The body is provided by Fivestar RaceCar Bodies and is similar to the ones used in the Mid-American Stock Car Series and the NASCAR PEAK Mexico Series. The spec engine is provided by General Motors. The Chevrolet Performance CT350 crate engine produces 350hp. The engine is a Chevrolet small-block in a V8 configuration.

Champions

References

External links
 Stockcar Racing League Southwest Tour Official Website

Stock car racing series in the United States
Sports in the Western United States